Norbert Felsinger (born 17 July 1939) is an Austrian former figure skater. He is a two-time European medalist, having won silver in 1960 and bronze in 1959, and a seven-time Austrian national champion. He placed seventh at the 1956 Winter Olympics and fourth at the 1960 Winter Olympics. His skating club was Wiener Eislauf Verein (WEV).

Results

References
 

1939 births
Austrian male single skaters
Olympic figure skaters of Austria
Figure skaters at the 1956 Winter Olympics
Figure skaters at the 1960 Winter Olympics
Living people
European Figure Skating Championships medalists